The following highways are numbered 914:

Canada

Costa Rica
 National Route 914

United States